Charlie Clark may refer to:

 Charlie Clark (Scottish footballer) (1878–1930), Scottish footballer
 Charlie Clark (English footballer) (1917–1943), English footballer
 Charlie Clark (politician), Canadian politician
 Charlie Clark (cyclist), British Olympic cyclist

See also
 Charles Clark (disambiguation)